Nekemias cantoniensis, is a vine native to China, Japan, Malaysia, Thailand, and Vietnam.  It was previously placed as several species in the genus Ampelopsis.

References

External links

cantoniensis
Flora of China
Flora of Japan
Flora of Peninsular Malaysia
Flora of Thailand
Flora of Vietnam
Plants described in 1833